The Walter and Ruby Behlen House is a historic one-story house in Columbus, Nebraska. It was built in 1958 for Walter Behlen, a co-founder of the Behlen Manufacturing Company. It was designed in the Moderne style by architect Jack Savage of the Leo Daly architectural firm, and meant to be a "showcase for the potential uses of industrial materials for domestic purposes." It has been listed on the National Register of Historic Places since March 11, 2003.

References

		
National Register of Historic Places in Platte County, Nebraska
Houses completed in 1958
Moderne architecture in the United States
1958 establishments in Nebraska